Carphina is a genus of beetles in the family Cerambycidae, containing the following species:

 Carphina arcifera Bates, 1872
 Carphina assula (Bates, 1864)
 Carphina elliptica (Germar, 1824)
 Carphina ligneola (Bates, 1865)
 Carphina lignicolor (Bates, 1865)
 Carphina melanura Monne & Monne, 2007
 Carphina occulta Monné, 1990
 Carphina petulans Kirsch, 1875
 Carphina sigillata Monné, 1985

References

 
Acanthocinini